Zone 69 is a zone of the municipality of Al Daayen in the state of Qatar. The main districts recorded in the 2015 population census were Al Egla, Al Kharayej, Jabal Thuaileb, Lusail, and Wadi Al Banat. 

Another district which falls within its administrative boundaries is Al Aaliya Island.

Demographics

Land use
The Ministry of Municipality and Environment (MME) breaks down land use in the zone as follows.

References 

Zones of Qatar
Al Daayen